Michael George Ellis  (born January 9, 1973) is a Canadian politician who has represented Calgary-West in the Legislative Assembly of Alberta since 2014, sitting as a member of the United Conservative Party (UCP). Ellis is the Minister of Public Safety and Emergency Services in Alberta. Prior to entering politics, he worked as a police officer.

Background 
Ellis was born and raised in Calgary, where he was a police sergeant with the Calgary Police Service.

He is married with three children.

Political career 
Ellis was first elected to the Legislative Assembly of Alberta in a by-election on October 27, 2014 as a Progressive Conservative (PC). He was re-elected in the 2015 and 2019 and has also been the government whip since April 30, 2019.

He had previously challenged his predecessor, Ken Hughes, in a nomination contest in the same district for the 2012 Alberta general election,

Associate minister 
Premier Jason Kenny named Ellis as Associate Minister of Mental Health and Addictions in a 2021 cabinet shuffle.

Election results

References

1973 births
Canadian police officers
Living people
Members of the Executive Council of Alberta
Politicians from Calgary
Progressive Conservative Association of Alberta MLAs
21st-century Canadian politicians
United Conservative Party MLAs